Alan Jeffery Anderson (born October 16, 1982) is an American former professional basketball player.

College career
Anderson attended Michigan State University (MSU), where he played college basketball with the Michigan State Spartans men's basketball team.

During his college career he was one of MSU's best ball handlers. He was the team's primary point guard during his junior season. Anderson, as a college senior, averaged 13.2 points, 5.6 rebounds and 1.7 assists per game, earning All-Big Ten Conference Team honors. He also helped lead the Spartans to the 2005 NCAA Men's Division I Basketball Tournament's Final Four. He was voted the team's MVP by the team's players and the media as a senior. He earned his bachelor's degree in family community services from Michigan State in August 2005.

Professional career

Charlotte Bobcats (2005–2006) 
Anderson signed with the Charlotte Bobcats in August 2005. He was waived by the Bobcats on November 28, 2006. but re-signed him on March 17, 2007 for the rest of the 2006–07 season.

Tulsa 66ers (2006–2007) 
Anderson played with the NBA D-League's Tulsa 66ers during the 2006–07 season., averaging 15.8 points per game.

Return to Charlotte (2007) 
Anderson was re-signed by the Charlotte Bobcats on March 17, 2007, for the rest of the 2006–07 season.

Virtus Bologna (2007–2008) 
On September 13, 2007, Anderson signed a contract with the Italian League club Virtus Bologna.

Triumph Lyubertsy (2008) 
After spending one season with Bologna, Anderson signed with the Russian League club Triumph Lyubertsy in 2008.

Cibona Zagreb (2008–2009) 
Anderson joined the Adriatic League club Cibona Zagreb on December 31, 2008.

Maccabi Tel Aviv (2009–2010) 
On May 24, 2009, Anderson signed with the Israeli League club Maccabi Tel Aviv. He left after one year.

New Mexico Thunderbirds (2010)
Anderson was selected by the New Mexico Thunderbirds with the second overall pick in the 2010 NBA Development League Draft. Through 10 games with New Mexico, Anderson averaged 21.3 points per game, including a season high of 34 points against the Idaho Stampede on November 20.

FC Barcelona (2010–2011) 
On December 21, 2010, Anderson signed with Spanish League club FC Barcelona, the 2009–10 EuroLeague champion. He was voted MVP of the 2010–11 Spanish King's Cup. Anderson was a key player in the final, chalking up 19 points in the win. He left after one season.

Toronto Raptors (2012–2013) 
On March 26, 2012, Anderson signed a 10-day contract with the Toronto Raptors. On April 17, 2012, Anderson signed with the Toronto Raptors for the remainder of the 2011–12 season. While playing in Toronto he was able to win the trust of Dwane Casey and started over James Johnson. Out of his 17 games with the Toronto Raptors he started 12, averaging 9.6 points per game in 27.1 minutes. He re-signed with the Raptors on July 30, 2012. During his time with the Raptors, Anderson became a bit of a polarizing figure amongst fans. Some praised his defensive efforts, while others referred to him as a ball-hog, the latter was especially evident after his overtime performance against the Miami Heat on January 24, 2013. Upon making two baskets in overtime, Anderson proceeded to shoot on every offensive possession afterwards, missing his next six shots (5 of those attempts and misses were 3-point attempts). Despite the poor showing, he finished the season with the Raptors before becoming an unrestricted free agent.

Brooklyn Nets (2013–2015) 
On July 30, 2013, Anderson signed with the Brooklyn Nets. On July 15, 2014, he re-signed with the Nets.

Washington Wizards (2015–2016) 
On July 12, 2015, Anderson signed with the Washington Wizards. On October 13, 2015, he had successful surgery on his left ankle and was ruled out for the first half of the 2015–16 season. Anderson made his debut for the Wizards on February 24, 2016, scoring nine points in 16 minutes against the Chicago Bulls.

Los Angeles Clippers (2016–2017 
On August 3, 2016, Anderson signed with the Los Angeles Clippers.

Lakeland Magic (2018)
On February 10, 2018, Anderson was acquired off waivers by the Lakeland Magic of the NBA G League.

Anderson also played for the Triplets of the Big3.

Career statistics

College

|-
| align="left" | 2001–02
| align="left" | Michigan State
| 31 || 23 || 24.5 || .450 || .500 || .770 || 4.2 || 1.6 || .6 || .1 || 6.5
|-
| align="left" | 2002–03
| align="left" | Michigan State
| 32 || 28 || 27.6 || .503 || .308 || .842 || 3.7 || 3.3 || .7 || .3 || 9.8
|-
| align="left" | 2003–04
| align="left" | Michigan State
| 30 || 26 || 28.7 || .467 || .354 || .805 || 3.1 || 3.2 || 1.0 || .2 || 8.1
|-
| align="left" | 2004–05
| align="left" | Michigan State
| 33 || 33 || 26.6 || .556 || .385 || .877 || 5.6 || 1.7 || 1.0 || .2 || 13.2
|- class="sortbottom"
| style="text-align:center;" colspan="2"| Career
| 126 || 110 || 26.8 || .503 || .366 || .831 || 4.2 || 2.4 || .8 || .2 || 9.5
|}

NBA

Regular season

|-
| style="text-align:left;"| 
| style="text-align:left;"| Charlotte
| 36 || 7 || 15.7 || .414 || .414 || .805 || 1.9 || .9 || .3 || .1 || 5.8
|-
| style="text-align:left;"| 
| style="text-align:left;"| Charlotte
| 17 || 0 || 15.1 || .457 || .250 || .826 || 1.9 || 1.2 || .4 || .0 || 5.8
|-
| style="text-align:left;"| 
| style="text-align:left;"| Toronto
| 17 || 12 || 27.1 || .387 || .393 || .853 || 2.0 || 1.5 || .3 || .2 || 9.6
|-
| style="text-align:left;"| 
| style="text-align:left;"| Toronto
| 65 || 2 || 23.0 || .383 || .333 || .857 || 2.3 || 1.6 || .7 || .1 || 10.7
|-
| style="text-align:left;"| 
| style="text-align:left;"| Brooklyn
| 78 || 26 || 22.7 || .400 || .339 || .780 || 2.2 || 1.0 || .6 || .1 || 7.2
|-
| style="text-align:left;"| 
| style="text-align:left;"| Brooklyn
| 74 || 19 || 23.6 || .443 || .348 ||.812 || 2.8 || 1.1 || .8 || .1 || 7.4
|-
| style="text-align:left;"| 
| style="text-align:left;"| Washington
| 13 || 0 || 14.8 || .356 || .324 || .733 || 2.1 || 1.1 || .3 || .1 || 5.0
|-
| style="text-align:left;"| 
| style="text-align:left;"| L.A. Clippers
| 30 || 0 || 10.3 || .375 || .318 || .750 || .8 || .4 || .1 || .0 || 2.9
|- class="sortbottom"
| style="text-align:center;" colspan="2"| Career
| 330 || 66 || 20.6 || .405 || .344 || .816 || 2.2 || 1.1 || .6 || .1 || 7.3

Playoffs

|-
| style="text-align:left;"| 2014
| style="text-align:left;"| Brooklyn
| 12 || 2 || 21.8 || .403 || .290 || .667 || 2.7 || 1.3 || .8 || .0 || 5.9
|- 
| style="text-align:left;"| 2015
| style="text-align:left;"| Brooklyn
| 6 || 0 || 23.7 || .610 || .625 || .667 || 3.5 || 1.2 || .7 || .2 || 11.0
|- class="sortbottom"
| style="text-align:center;" colspan="2"| Career
| 18 || 2 || 22.4 || .485 || .404 || .667 || 2.9 || 1.2 || .8 || .1 || 7.6

EuroLeague

|-
| style="text-align:left;"| 2007–08
| style="text-align:left;"| Virtus Bologna
| 9 || 4 || 25.6 || .398 || .250 || .909 || 3.0 || 1.1 || 1.1 || .3 || 11.2 || 9.6
|-
| style="text-align:left;"| 2008–09
| style="text-align:left;"| Cibona
| 8 || 7 || 31.4 || .383 || .394 || .841 || 4.8 || 2.0 || 2.0 || .5 || 15.3 || 14.8
|-
| style="text-align:left;"| 2009–10
| style="text-align:left;"| Maccabi
| 20 || 18 || 28.4 || .434 || .339 || .800 || 3.6 || 2.3 || 1.6 || .2 || 13.7 || 13.1
|-
| style="text-align:left;"| 2010–11
| style="text-align:left;"| Barcelona
| 10 || 10 || 27.2 || .448 || .455 || .844 || 3.1 || 1.5 || .6 || .2 || 11.4 || 10.6
|- class="sortbottom"
| style="text-align:center;" colspan="2"| Career
| 47 || 39 || 28.2 || .420 || .365 || .832 || 3.6 || 1.8 || 1.4 || .3 || 13.0 || 12.1

References

External links
 
 Euroleague.net profile
 ACB.com profile
 Michigan State bio

1982 births
Living people
ABA League players
African-American basketball players
American expatriate basketball people in Canada
American expatriate basketball people in China
American expatriate basketball people in Croatia
American expatriate basketball people in Israel
American expatriate basketball people in Italy
American expatriate basketball people in Russia
American expatriate basketball people in Spain
American men's basketball players
Basketball players from Minneapolis
BC Zenit Saint Petersburg players
Big3 players
Brooklyn Nets players
Canton Charge players
Charlotte Bobcats players
FC Barcelona Bàsquet players
KK Cibona players
Lakeland Magic players
Liga ACB players
Los Angeles Clippers players
Maccabi Tel Aviv B.C. players
Michigan State Spartans men's basketball players
New Mexico Thunderbirds players
Parade High School All-Americans (boys' basketball)
Shandong Hi-Speed Kirin players
Shooting guards
Toronto Raptors players
Tulsa 66ers players
Undrafted National Basketball Association players
Virtus Bologna players
Washington Wizards players
Edison High School (Minnesota) alumni
DeLaSalle High School (Minneapolis) alumni
21st-century African-American sportspeople
20th-century African-American sportspeople
American men's 3x3 basketball players